James Michael Cavanaugh (July 4, 1823 – October 30, 1879) was a U.S. Representative from Minnesota and a delegate from the Territory of Montana. He was born in Springfield, Massachusetts, July 4, 1823 and received an academic education. He engaged in newspaper work, studied law, and was admitted to the bar in 1854 and began practice in Davenport, Iowa. He then moved to Chatfield, Fillmore County, Minnesota, in 1854 and continued the practice of law; upon the admission of Minnesota as a State into the Union, in 1858, was elected as a Democrat to the thirty-fifth congress and served from May 11, 1858, to March 3, 1859; unsuccessful candidate for re-election in 1858 to the thirty-sixth congress; moved to Colorado in 1861 and resumed the practice of law; also engaged in mining; member of the State constitutional convention in 1865; moved to Montana in 1866; as a Democrat, he was elected a delegate to the fortieth and forty-first congresses (March 4, 1867 – March 3, 1871); unsuccessful candidate for renomination in 1870; engaged in the practice of law in New York City; returned to Colorado in 1879 and settled in Leadville, where he died October 30, 1879. He is buried in the Greenwood Cemetery in New York City.

On May 28, 1868, Cavanaugh stated within the House of Representatives - "I like an Indian better dead than living. I have never in my life seen a good Indian - and I have seen thousands - except when I have seen a dead Indian."   Similar statements were also ascribed to civil and Indian war general Philip Sheridan,  although he always denied making them.

Notes

1823 births
1879 deaths
Burials at Green-Wood Cemetery
Delegates to the United States House of Representatives from Montana Territory
Montana Democrats
Colorado Democrats
Democratic Party members of the United States House of Representatives from Minnesota
19th-century American politicians
People from Chatfield, Minnesota
Politicians from Springfield, Massachusetts
Iowa lawyers
Colorado lawyers
Lawyers from New York City
Massachusetts lawyers
Minnesota lawyers
19th-century American lawyers